The Bastien Range is an Antarctic mountain range of moderate height which extends in a NW-SE direction for about , flanking the SW side of Nimitz Glacier and the Sentinel Range, in the Ellsworth Mountains.

Named by US-ACAN for Thomas W. Bastien, geologist, leader of the helicopter supported University of Minnesota Geological Party to these mountains, 1963–64. Bastien was also a member of a party to the Ellsworth Mountains in 1961–62.

Features
Geographical features include:

 Bergison Peak
 Bowie Crevasse Field
 Camp Hills
 Ereta Peak
 Hodges Knoll
 Karasura Glacier
 Klenova Peak
 Mount Fisek
 Mount Klayn
 Nimitz Glacier
 O'Neal Nunataks
 Patmos Peak
 Wild Knoll

References

Mountain ranges of Ellsworth Land
Ellsworth Mountains